Nicolaj Kopernikus (born Nicolaj Christiansen, 9 August 1967 in Glostrup) is a Danish actor most famous for his portrayal of Vagn Skærbæk in the first series of the crime drama series The Killing. Kopernikus won a Bodil Award for Best Actor in a Supporting Role for his role in The Bench.

Selected filmography

References

External links 
 

1967 births
21st-century Danish male actors
Best Supporting Actor Bodil Award winners
Danish male film actors
Danish male television actors
Living people
People from Glostrup Municipality